John Glenn (October 9, 1795 – July 8, 1853) was a United States district judge of the United States District Court for the District of Maryland.

Education and career

Born on October 9, 1795, in Elkton, Maryland, Glenn read law in 1817. He was in private practice in Baltimore, Maryland until 1852, with the exception of a period of service as United States Attorney for the District of Maryland.

Federal judicial service

Glenn was nominated by President Millard Fillmore on March 18, 1852, to a seat on the United States District Court for the District of Maryland vacated by Judge Upton Scott Heath. He was confirmed by the United States Senate on March 19, 1852, and received his commission the same day. His service terminated on July 8, 1853, due to his death near Catonsville, Maryland.

Estate

Glenn purchased and expanded his brother's estate Hilton near Catonsville in 1842. He entertained Robert E. Lee as a guest several times and lived there until his death. The estate is currently part of the Community College of Baltimore County, with the majority of the original property subdivided for housing developments.

References

Sources
 

1795 births
1853 deaths
United States Attorneys for the District of Maryland
Judges of the United States District Court for the District of Maryland
United States federal judges appointed by Millard Fillmore
19th-century American judges
People from Elkton, Maryland
People from Catonsville, Maryland
19th-century American politicians
United States federal judges admitted to the practice of law by reading law